Schwabach station is a railway station in the municipality of Schwabach, located in Middle Franconia, Germany. The station is on the Nuremberg–Augsburg and Nuremberg–Roth lines of Deutsche Bahn.

References

Nuremberg S-Bahn stations
Railway stations in Bavaria
Schwabach